Anthony Augustine (born September 26, 1980) is a retired Grenadian footballer.

Career

College and amateur
Augustine came to the United States in 2000 to play college soccer at Southern New Hampshire University. While at SNHU Augustine was named to the NSCAA All-New England second team and the ALL NE-10 team in 2002 and 2003.

Professional
Augustine turned professional in 2005, playing for the Western Mass Pioneers in the USL Second Division. He made his debut on April 22, 2005, in the Pioneers' home opener against the Charlotte Eagles, and has been with the team ever since, anchoring the team's midfield. He helped the Pioneers to the 2005 USL2 regular season championship, and has made over 70 appearances for the team in total.

International
Augustine has been a part of the Grenada national football team camp since 2001, and made his most recent appearance for the Spice Boys in a 2004 world cup qualifier against Guyana.

References

External links
Pioneers bio

1980 births
Living people
Grenadian footballers
Grenada international footballers
Western Mass Pioneers players
USL Second Division players
USL League Two players
Southern New Hampshire Penmen men's soccer players
Grenadian expatriate footballers
Expatriate soccer players in the United States
Grenadian expatriate sportspeople in the United States
People from Saint Mark Parish, Grenada
Association football midfielders